Bad Penny may refer to:

In aircraft
 "Bad Penny" (aircraft), a nickname for an Avro Lancaster involved in Operation Manna

In media and entertainment
 "Bad Penny" (song), a song by Rory Gallagher
 Bad Penny (TV series), an English sitcom
 "Bad Penny Blues", a jazz piece by Humphrey Lyttelton
 "Bad Penny", a song by noise rock band Big Black on their 1987 studio album Songs About Fucking